Shihāb al-Dīn Abu'l-‘Abbās Aḥmad ibn Muḥammad ibn Abī Bakr al-Qasṭallānī al-Qutaybī al-Shāfi‘ī, also known as  Al-Qasṭallānī was a Sunni Islamic scholar who specialized in hadith and theology. He owed his literary fame mainly to his exhaustive commentary on the Sahih al-Bukhari entitled Irshād al-Sarī fī Sharḥ al-Bukhārī.

Life
He was married to 'Aishah al-Ba'uniyyah.

He was a contemporary of Suyuti, and between the two there were several scholarly challenges, Arabic: 'Khusumat'. The subject of the arguments were focused on al-Qasṭallānī's Shaykh al-Sakhawi, but eventually al-Qasṭallānī went to Suyuti to apologize.

Views
Qasṭallānī settled on the Shāfi‘ī school later in life, though he was initially a follower of the Maliki school in jurisprudence. In regard to Islamic theology, Qasṭallānī was a proponent of the Ash'ari school for which he is considered one of the main figureheads.

Works
Al-Muwahib al-Ladunniyyah bi al-Minah al-Muhammadiyya
Irshad al-Sari, 10 vol, one of the best commentaries on Sahih Bukhari
Masālik al-Ḥunafā’ ilā Mashāri‘ al-Ṣalāt 'alā al-Nabī al-Muṣṭafā 
Minhaj al-Ibtihāj Sharḥ Muslim b. al-Ḥajjāj, a commentary on Sahih Muslim
al-Jannāt al-Dānī fī Ḥall Ḥirz al-Amānī, a commentary on the Shatibiyyah
al-Fatḥ al-Mawāhibī, a biography of the author of Shatibiyyah
A commentary on the Burda
Maqamat al-‘Ārifīn

See also 
 List of Ash'aris and Maturidis

References

External links 

Shafi'is
Asharis
Hadith scholars
Egyptian imams
15th-century Muslim theologians
Sunni Muslim scholars of Islam
16th-century Muslim theologians
1448 births
1517 deaths